Mu’tah University (Jāmi‘atu Mu'tah) is a public university in the Jordanian town of Mu'tah which was founded on 22 March 1981 by the Royal Decree to be a national institution for military and civilian higher education.

Academics
In addition to the military college, Mu'tah University is divided into the following 15 main faculties:

Faculty of Agriculture
Faculty of Arts
Faculty of Business Administration
Faculty of Educational Sciences
Faculty of Engineering
Faculty of Humanities & Social Sciences
Faculty of Law
Faculty of Medicine
Faculty of Nursing
Faculty of Science
Faculty of Information Technology
Faculty of Shari'a (Islamic Studies)
Faculty of Sport Sciences
Faculty of Pharmaceutical Sciences
Faculty of Graduate Studies

Faculty of Medicine

The Faculty of Medicine of Mu'tah University was founded in 2001; in accordance with the vision of King Abdullah II of the need of the kingdom to have more doctors and to have a medical school in the southern part of the country.
The number of students enrolled at this medical school has increased tremendously over the last 9 years; the number admitted in the academic year 2001/2002 was 27 students while in the academic year 2009/2010 the number was 185.
The faculty awards its graduates a bachelor's degree in Medicine and Surgery M.B.B.S after completing a minimum of 262 credit hours. These include 31 credit hours of university requirements, 10 credit hours of basic scientific requirements, 86 credit hours of basic medical science requirements, and 135 credit hours of medical science requirements.

The University of Mu'tah signed an agreement with the Jordanian Ministry of Health for the purpose of organizing contacts between the University and the Ministry, and to make Karak government hospital the main training site for the students of the faculty of Medicine. The university also signed an agreement with the Royal Medical Services Administration to make Prince Ali Military Hospital a teaching hospital in addition to other Royal Medical Services Hospitals, including King Hussien Medical Centre.
The faculty also offers research programmes and postgraduate medical education. 
The primary mission of the Faculty of Medicine is to support the healthcare infrastructure in the southern region of the kingdom and national contribution in formation of highly competitive physicians at the national and international level to afford the different postgraduate training programs.
The medical school is quite advanced in its facilities, it includes an entire department dedicated to plastination, for anatomy teaching, which is a pioneer project in the country and it will be an integral part in the teaching process of anatomy laboratories. Video conferencing is also used, eminent experts from around the world give lectures via the university's live video and audio communication facilities ME-RSLD.
The teaching plan for obtaining the bachelor's degree in medicine and surgery in Mu'tah University is distinguishable in its emphasis on community medicine and public health, as well as its concern with the other medical sciences. 
The teaching system at the Faculty of Medicine, University of Mu'tah, is centered on the modern method implemented by other world universities, namely an integrated modular teaching of the different systems of the human body. 
The graduation with the bachelor's degree in medicine and surgery demands the regularly attending student to complete all the requirements of the teaching plan as mentioned before; the cumulative average should not be less than 60%. This plan is applied for a minimum period of six academic years, extending to 8 years as a maximum.

Postgraduate programs
In the field of postgraduate studies, the University established a Ph.D. program in Arabic language and literature in addition to various master programs in Sciences, literature and Languages, Economics and Management, Geography, Electrical Engineering (Communications), Education, Law and Police Studies. There are also plans for establishing other programs to keep up with contemporary changes in science, technology and education. The University also runs successful evening studies programs. The evening studies program has been established with the aim of serving employees in the local community and in Jordan as a whole to continue their education. In addition, the University offers Parallel Studies Programs in many fields of studies.

Journals 
Mu'tah University issues three journals:

Humanities and Social Sciences Series (Arabic:  مجلة مؤتة للبحوث والدراسات / سِلسلة العلوم الإنسانية والاجتماعية)  The journal publishes original scientific works in natural and applied sciences, it is published by the Deanship of Academic Research and is indexed and refereed journal. A volume is published annually, .
Natural and Applied Sciences Series (Arabic:  مجلة مؤتة للبحوث والدراسات /سلسلة العلوم الطبيعية والتطبيقية) An annual journal that publishes original works in humanities and social sciences, published by Dar Mu’tah University Press. .
Jordan Journal of Arabic Language and Literature (Arabic:  المجلة الأردنية في اللغة العربية وآدابها) An international journal published in Arabic by the Ministry of Higher Education and Scientific Research in cooperation with Mu'tah University. Articles in languages other than Arabic are occasionally accepted for publication.

References

External links

Mutah's Video conferencing.

 
Universities in Jordan
Educational institutions established in 1981
Karak Governorate
1981 establishments in Jordan